The Red Deer Region is a land-use framework region in Alberta, Canada. One of seven in the province, each is intended to develop and implement a regional plan, complementing the planning efforts of member municipalities in order to coordinate future growth. Corresponding roughly to major watersheds while following municipal boundaries, these regions are managed by Alberta Environment and Parks.

Communities

The following municipalities are contained in the Red Deer Region.

 

Cities
 Lacombe
 Red Deer

Towns
 Bentley
 Blackfalds
 Bowden
 Carstairs
 Castor
 Coronation
 Didsbury
 Drumheller
 Eckville
 Hanna
 Innisfail
 Olds
 Oyen
 Penhold
 Ponoka
 Rimbey
 Stettler
 Sundre

Towns continued
 Sylvan Lake
 Three Hills
 Trochu

Villages
 Acme
 Alix
 Big Valley
 Carbon
 Cereal
 Clive
 Consort
 Cremona
 Delburne
 Delia
 Donalda
 Elnora
 Empress
 Gadsby
 Halkirk
 Linden
 Morrin

Villages continued
 Munson
 Veteran
 Youngstown

Municipal districts
 Municipal District of Acadia
 Kneehill County
 Lacombe County
 Mountain View County
 County of Paintearth
 Ponoka County
 Red Deer County
 Starland County
 County of Stettler

Special areas
 Special Area No. 2
 Special Area No. 3
 Special Area No. 4

Indian reserves
 Ermineskin 138
 Montana 139
 Samson 137

References

Alberta land-use framework regions